High Society Blues  is a 1930 American pre-Code film starring Janet Gaynor and Charles Farrell. The movie was written by Howard J. Green from the story by Dana Burnett, and directed by David Butler.

Gaynor and Farrell made almost a dozen films together, including Frank Borzage's classics Seventh Heaven (1927), Street Angel (1928), and Lucky Star (1929); Gaynor won the first Academy Award for Best Actress for the first two and F. W. Murnau's Sunrise: A Song of Two Humans (1927).

Plot
A new country family comes to live among established wealthy neighbors.

Cast
Janet Gaynor as Eleanor Divine
Charles Farrell as Eddie Granger
William Collier, Sr. as Horace Divine
Hedda Hopper as Mrs. Divine
Joyce Compton as Pearl Granger
Lucien Littlefield as Eli Granger
Louise Fazenda as Mrs. Granger
Brandon Hurst as Jowles

External links
 
 
 Janet Gaynor, Hedda Hopper in a scene from the film
 1930: Hedda Hopper High Society Blues vintage photo W554 (scene with the main cast)

1930 films
1930s romantic musical films
American romantic musical films
American black-and-white films
1930s English-language films
Films directed by David Butler
Fox Film films
Films produced by William Fox
Films scored by Samuel Kaylin
1930s American films